Natalie Metcalf  (née Haythornthwaite; born 9 December 1992) is an English netball player. She was part of the England squad that won gold at the 2018 Commonwealth Games. Metcalf played for Manchester Thunder and Wasps Netball in the English Superleague, winning consecutive premierships with the Wasps in 2017 and 2018. She played for the New South Wales Swifts in the Australian Super Netball league as a replacement player for some games in late 2018, before being permanently picked up by the Swifts for the 2019 season. Despite an injury-interrupted start to the season, Haythornthwaite was selected in the England 12-player squad for the 2019 Netball World Cup.

Metcalf announced in September 2021 that she would be leaving Australia to return to the UK, and would be getting married in December.  She is rejoining Manchester Thunder for 2022 .  At the end of December 2021 she married Josh Metcalf and has taken his surname.

As Natalie Haythornthwaite she was named vice captain of the England Team for the Netball Quad Series commencing 15 January 2022 against Australia, New Zealand and South Africa.

References

External links
 England Netball Profile

1992 births
Living people
Sportspeople from Keighley
English netball players
Netball players at the 2018 Commonwealth Games
Commonwealth Games gold medallists for England
Commonwealth Games medallists in netball
New South Wales Swifts players
2019 Netball World Cup players
English expatriate netball people in Australia
Wasps Netball players
Manchester Thunder players
Netball Superleague players
Yorkshire Jets players
Suncorp Super Netball players
Netball players at the 2022 Commonwealth Games
Medallists at the 2018 Commonwealth Games